Soledad Fandiño (born 7 April 1982) is an Argentine stage, television and film actress.

Fandiño debuted as an actress in the 2003 television series Rebelde Way. After the series, she was then cast as Felicitas in the popular family sitcom Ricos y Mocosos (2004–2005) which propelled her career with best new actress nominations from Martín Fierro Awards and Clarín Awards. For the next three years she continued earning lead roles in family sitcoms and TV series produced by Pol-ka for Canal 13. She transitioned to stage, television films and mini-series.

In 2009, Fandiño played the female lead in Astral Theater's production of Lewis Carroll's Alice in Wonderland directed by Alicia Zanca. Later that year she performed the lead in episode El Manto Chino of the Sci-Fi anthology series Dromo. In 2010, she played an actress in love with Juan Perugia, played by Gaston Pauls in Telefe's comedy series Todos contra Juan 2. She was subsequently summoned by director Alberto Lecchi to film in Uruguay the role of Alicia, a victim of domestic violence in the drama series Maltratadas. This dramatic turn was followed by a starring role opposite Independent Spirit Award winner and Bafta nominee Rodrigo de la Serna in drama series Contra las cuerdas (2010); the only Argentine dramatic series nominated for an International Emmy Awards. She went back to the stage for the play Ceremonia Secreta (2011) an adaptation of Marco Denevi's novel, directed by Oscar Barney Finn at the Margarita Xirgu theater, Soledad playing opposite Uruguayan stage actress Estela Medina, had the chance to show her dramatic abilities performing the role of Cecilia Engelhardt, a physically and mentally abused woman who loses her mind and tries desperately to find her dead mother. This role earned her a nomination for the Florencio Sanchez Awards 2012.

Later that year, Fandiño starred opposite Luis Machin in "Cuestión de Poder", an episode of the anthology series Televisión por la Inclusión. In 2012 feature film director Juan José Campanella featured Soledad in Latin Grammy Awards winner Calle 13 music video "La Vuelta al Mundo".

Fandiño recently completed a production with Martín Piroyansky and Betiana Blum in Telefe's comedy series Mi Viejo Verde.

Early life
Fandiño spent part of her childhood in Monte Grande, a city in Buenos Aires Province while attending Colegio San Marcos de Monte Grande, a prestigious bilingual school. During her teenage years she lived in Villa Lugano and graduated from Colegio Macnab Bernal. This was when she discovered her love for the stage. This experience led her to drama studies at Escuela de Teatro Agustin Alezzo while studying law at Universidad Catolica Argentina. After a year and a half she left law school for Advertisement studies at Universidad Argentina de la Empresa while taking theater classes at Escuela de Nora Moseinco.

Around this time Fandiño made her foray into television in Rebelde Way and Ricos y Mocosos. She then went on to starring roles in family sitcoms produced by Pol-ka for Canal 13 and played the lead on stage in Teatro Astral's production of Alice in Wonderland. Fandiño is currently studying at the Actors Circle Theatre.

Career transition
Initially performing roles in family TV series, Fandiño's passion and wishes to push her craft led to play complex and different roles far away from herself in primetime television films and mini-series like Dromo, Maltratadas and Televisión x la inclusión. With her starring role in Contra las Cuerdas, she established her rising stardom. On stage, she displayed her acting abilities in the play Ceremonia Secreta, performing Cecilia Engelhardt, a physically and mentally abused young woman who loses her mind.  Her performance garnered her a Florencio Sánchez Award nomination in 2012.

Personal life
Fandiño married René Pérez Joglar in January 2013 in a private ceremony in Puerto Rico. The couple divorced in 2017.

Filmography

Television

Stage

Film

Videoclips

Awards and nominations

References

External links
 Official Website
 

1982 births
Living people
Argentine film actresses
Argentine stage actresses
Argentine television actresses
Actresses from Buenos Aires
Participants in Argentine reality television series
Bailando por un Sueño (Argentine TV series) participants